Geraint Morgan Hugh Hughes (born 21 November 1934) is a retired Anglican Priest.

He was born into an ecclesiastical family, the son of The Ven. Hubert Hughes (priest), sometime Archdeacon of Gower. and educated at Brecon Grammar School, Keble College, Oxford, and St. Michael's College, Llandaff. After National Service in the RAF he was ordained in 1959. He served curacies at Gorseinon and Oystermouth; and then held incumbencies at Llanbadarn Fawr and  Llandrindod. He was a Canon at Brecon Cathedral from 1989 to 1998 when he became its Dean, a post he held for two years.

References

1934 births
People educated at Brecon Grammar School
Alumni of Keble College, Oxford
Alumni of St Michael's College, Llandaff
Deans of Brecon Cathedral
Living people